Khushin (also Romanized as Khūshīn) is a village in Ruin Rural District, in the Central District of Esfarayen County, North Khorasan Province, Iran. At the 2006 census, its population was 1,725, in 417 families.

References 

Populated places in Esfarayen County